Pseudochoragus is a genus of fungus weevils in the beetle family Anthribidae. There are about six described species in Pseudochoragus.

Species
These six species belong to the genus Pseudochoragus:
 Pseudochoragus bostrychoides Fahrs., 1839
 Pseudochoragus brachycerus Petri, 1912
 Pseudochoragus brachyderus Petri, 1926
 Pseudochoragus brachyserus Wolfrum, 1953
 Pseudochoragus nitens (LeConte, 1884)
 Pseudochoragus piceus Wolfrum, 1953

References

Further reading

 
 

Anthribidae
Articles created by Qbugbot